Susie Scott may refer to:

Susie Scott (model) (1960 Playboy Playmate)
Susie Scott Krabacher (1983 Playboy Playmate)